Kristjan Rahnu (born 29 August 1979 in Kohila) is a retired Estonian decathlete. His personal best dates back to 2005 when he did 8526 points in France, Arles on June 4–5. After many injuries and other issues, Rahnu is trying to make a successful return to the sport in 2009 for the first time since the European World Championships in 2006.

Achievements

Personal bests

References

External links

1979 births
Living people
People from Kohila
Estonian decathletes
Athletes (track and field) at the 2004 Summer Olympics
Olympic athletes of Estonia
World Athletics Championships athletes for Estonia